Rutela is a genus of beetles from the family Scarabaeidae.

Species
The genus includes the following species:

 Rutela formosa Burmeister, 1844
 Rutela lineola (Linnaeus, 1767)

References
 Biolib

Scarabaeidae